The Orange Lantern Corps is a supervillain organization published by DC Comics. They first appeared in Green Lantern (vol. 4) #25 and were created by Geoff Johns and Philip Tan.

Fictional character biography
The Orange Lantern Corps is a faction of the Emotional Spectrum that is associated with greed. Some millennia ago, the Guardians of the Universe fought the Orange Light's keeper Larfleeze which nearly destroyed both sides. They reached a peace treaty which stipulated that the Orange Light was to remain buried and that Okaara would remain outside the Green Lantern Corps' jurisdiction.

The Controllers were searching for the Orange Light in order to create their own Corps.

Following the "Final Crisis" storyline, the Controllers have found Okaara.

The Controllers found the Orange Lantern Battery in a cave. When they tried to take it, they were slaughtered by the Orange Lantern Corps. Because of the Controllers' transgression, Larfleeze contacted the Guardians of the Universe telling them that the treaty is now null and void.

Larfleeze started recruiting different aliens to join his Orange Lantern Corps.

One Orange Lantern Corps devoured a Sinestro Corps member who was fleeing Green Lantern Corps member Stel. The Guardians of the Universe take some Green Lantern Corps to Okaara to make sure the Orange Lantern Battery causes no harm. They meet up with Green Lantern Corps member Gretti. When they confronted Larfleeze, he unleashed Orange Lantern versions of the defeated Controllers on them where they slaughtered Gretti. Both Guardians of the Universe and Manhunters slaughtered each other while Hal Jordan confronted Larfleeze who had his knowledge of Parallax. In addition, the Orange Lantern members present were all constructs. Larfleeze was defeated by Blue Lantern Corps' ring and not destroyed, he later went to the homeworld of the Blue Lantern Corps due to being told about it.

During the "Blackest Night" storyline, Larfleeze and his Orange Lanterns are closing in the Blue Lantern Power Battery when the Black Lantern Corps arrives and reanimate the bodies of those whose identities that Larfleeze has stolen. Larfleeze then flees from the Black Lantern Corps and his reanimated Orange Lanterns when he is saved by Atrocitus. Both of them quarrel over the Orange Lantern battery until Hal Jordan, Carol Ferris, Indigo-1, and Sinestro arrive to recruit them in a plot to destroy the Black Lantern Power Battery. Larfleeze was able to get Lex Luthor to wield the Orange Lantern Ring after he was saved from some Black Lanterns that raided his bunker. Though Larfleeze and Lex Luthor clashed due to their insatiable greed. Once Nekron is defeated, Lex Luthor loses his Orange Lantern abilities and is handed over to Earth's heroes by a disgusted Larfleeze. As part of an agreement, Sayd becomes Larfleeze's personal Guardian of the Universe.

During the "Brightest Day" storyline, Larfleeze sends his Orange Lanterns to steal items so that he can give them to Santa Claus. Hal Jordan's fight with Larfleeze is crashed by Hector Hammond who swallowed the Orange Lantern Power Battery.

During the "War of the Green Lanterns" storyline, Larfleeze's ring and the rings of the Corps members were controlled by Krona who used them against the Green Lantern Corps, but the ring returned to its master after Hal Jordan killed Krona.

In 2011, "The New 52" rebooted the DC Universe. Kyle Rayner investigated some Orange Lantern Rings and found the constructs maintained their personalities. Its construct member Glomulus was posing as one of the Orange Lantern Rings. When a Reach assassin fights Kyle Rayner on Earth, he is dispersed by the Reach assassin. Larfleeze regenerates Glomulus with his memories intact, only for Glomulus to show an independent spirit when he acts to protect Kyle from Larfleeze. The side-effect later caused the Orange Lantern Corps' entity Ophidian to roam the universe.

Membership
Aside from the orange light user and those listed as "Former Members", there are not actually individuals who hold membership in the Orange Lantern Corps (in a conventional sense, there is no such Corps, only the orange light user himself/herself), but rather duplicates, referred to as "constructs" formed of orange light energy after the original persons were "consumed" and had their identities (later stated to be their very souls) "stolen". These construct Lanterns were designed by artist Philip Tan, and unlike the mostly-humanoid aliens who are members of the various Lantern Corps, most of them are bizarre and monstrous in shape. The graphic novel collection "Green Lantern: Agent Orange" includes several pages of Tan's original sketches for these creatures, including an unused concept for the Entity powering the Corps, a crocodile-like beast with a skeletal cage on its head. This Entity concept was later replaced by Ophidian (see below).

Leadership
 Larfleeze (of Sector 2828): As Larfleeze is too greedy to share his rings, except for one given to Lex Luthor at Ganthet's insistence during "Blackest Night", he uses his ring's ability to create constructs in order to field an entire army of Orange Lanterns to face his foes for him. His connection to his power battery allows him to maintain the constructs indefinitely, so long as he devotes attention to doing so. In one case, after reclaiming his power battery from Hal Jordan, Larfleeze withdraws the Orange Lantern Corps into his battery and uses the combined power to create a gigantic avatar of himself in order to attack the Green Lantern Corps. He later sends a life-sized avatar of himself to lead the attack against the Blue Lanterns on Odym. Kyle Rayner learns that the constructs apparently retain their original personalities, and it has since been confirmed that Larfleeze literally takes the souls of his Orange Lanterns when he claims them, as a highly spiritual race could not be claimed by Larfleeze as their souls passed on too quickly for him to absorb them. Larfleeze has since been removed from his ring when a New God stole it from him.

Known members

 Blume (of Sector 2751): A giant extraterrestrial head from the planet Blobba that proclaims himself a god of hunger so that he can intimidate the inhabitants of planets into feeding him their valuables. After failing to do the same to Larfleeze, he is made into an Orange Lantern construct and now patrols the Vega system. He consumes the Sinestro Corps member of sector 2825 and brands Green Lantern Stel with the symbol of the Orange Lantern Corps. During the "Blackest Night" storyline, his body is shown being reanimated as a Black Lantern.
 Clypta (of Sector 2829): An Orange Lantern from the Thieves' System that is reanimated as a member of the Black Lantern Corps during the "Blackest Night" storyline.
 The Controllers: Arrive on Okaara searching for the orange light in order to create their own Corps. Upon finding the orange power battery, they are confronted by Larfleeze and killed by his Orange Lanterns. Later they are also shown to have been assimilated into his army of constructs.
 Glomulus (of Sector 2826): A tavern cleaner on Okaara who, while there, is only allowed out of his cage to eat whatever food falls on the floor. After accidentally getting a taste for blood, Glomulus eats everyone in the tavern. Free, he makes his way into the woods and finds himself at Larfleeze's palace where he is consumed by Blume. His identity is stolen, turning him into an Orange Lantern. During the "Blackest Night" storyline, his body is shown being reanimated as a Black Lantern. In promotional art for the new series Green Lantern: New Guardians, Glomulus is shown to be the representative of the Orange Lantern Corps; subsequent information reveals that he was initially a construct posing as an Orange Lantern ring to help Larfleeze determine the reason for an initially-unspecified entity turning Kyle into a 'magnet' for other rings. He shows that he actually has his original personality and intelligence, claiming he's himself after Kyle questions if Larfleeze is just using the construct to keep an eye on them. Although he is dispersed by a Reach assassin during a fight on Earth, Larfleeze regenerates Glomulus with his memories intact, only for Glomulus to show an independent spirit when he acts to protect Kyle from Larfleeze.
 Gretti (former Green Lantern of Sector 2828): A former Green Lantern literally torn limb from limb by Larfleeze's constructs during the Green Lantern attack on Okaara. After his defeat, his identity is stolen, turning him into an Orange Lantern. During the "Blackest Night" storyline, his body is shown being reanimated as a Black Lantern.
 Guardian of the Universe: While Larfleeze's thieves guild and the Guardians fought for the orange power battery, the power of the orange light is unleashed, killing one of the Guardians in the process. He is shown as being turned into an Orange Lantern construct. In Green Lantern (vol. 4) #45, a male Guardian is shown being reanimated as a Black Lantern on Okaara. However, Sayd has recently stated that Larfleeze cannot convert Guardians into Orange Lanterns, suggesting that the Guardian was a more basic construct rather than the Guardian's actual spirit.
 Nat-Nat (of Sector 228): An Orange Lantern from the planet Limey Rock that is reanimated as a member of the Black Lantern Corps during the "Blackest Night" storyline.
 Sound Dancer (of Sector 911): An Orange Lantern from the Obsidian Deeps that is reanimated as a member of the Black Lantern Corps during the "Blackest Night" storyline. The Obsidian Deeps make up the lightless sector that Green Lantern (F Sharp Bell) Rot Lop Fan is from.
 Tammal-Tayn (of Sector 2813): An Orange Lantern from the planet Fylip that is reanimated as a member of the Black Lantern Corps during the "Blackest Night" storyline.
 Turpa: A member of the same guild of thieves as Larfleeze from the planet Ogatoo. Together the guild steals the Guardians' map to the Orange Power Battery, and upon finding it are so overcome with greed that they fight one another for it. Turpa is killed by the power of the orange light before Larfleeze and Blooch fight to the death for the orange power battery. He is shown as having been turned into an orange light construct.
 Warp Wrap (of Sector 2): An Orange Lantern from the planet Cairo that is reanimated as a member of the Black Lantern Corps during the "Blackest Night" storyline.

Former members
 Hal Jordan (of Sector 2814): A Green Lantern officer who, during his first encounter with Larfleeze, has managed to take the orange power battery from him and temporarily is transformed into a member of the Orange Lantern Corps. However, Larfleeze is able to recover the power battery soon after when Hal is overwhelmed by the hunger the Orange Lantern causes him to feel, noting that he feels starved after holding it for a few seconds. Hal later used Larfleeze's ring in conjunction with Sinestro's ring when the rest of the Green Lantern Corps were brought under Krona's control when he used Parallax to infect the Central Power Battery, although the ring was swiftly returned to its owner.
 Lex Luthor (of Sector 2814): During the "Blackest Night" storyline, Lex Luthor is granted membership to the Orange Lantern Corps for a period of 24 hours, becoming the only other living member of the Corps besides Larfleeze himself and Cade who started out living and ended living. In the final issue of Blackest Night, Luthor's power ring and Orange Lantern abilities faded away.
 Hector Hammond (of Sector 2814): A long time enemy of Hal Jordan who, after swallowing the Orange Lantern power battery and freeing Ophidian, becomes possessed by The Tempter. Though not in possession of an orange power ring, as the host of the Avarice Entity, he had no need for one.
 Krona (of Sector 0): During the War of the Green Lanterns, Krona was briefly able to take control of Larfleeze's ring and the other six rings, using them against the Green Lantern Corps, but the ring returned to its master after Hal Jordan killed Krona.
 Kyle Rayner (of Sector 2814): In the early storylines of The New 52, Kyle has apparently become a 'magnet' for other Corps rings, including an Orange Lantern ring, which was later revealed to be Glomulus, set by Larfleeze to discover more about the rings thief and trick the other Corps into doing his work for him; he was briefly in command of rings from all seven Corps, but he was only able to tap into their power briefly before the strain of doing so exhausted him. He has since learned how to wield the power of all seven spectrums individually- mastering Avarice by getting past Larfleeze in a fight and recharging his ring from Larfleeze's battery- altering his appearance to match each, and elevating himself to White Lantern status once he mastered them all.

Entity
The avarice entity is called Ophidian (Larfleeze refers to it as Ophidian the Tempter), and takes the form of a snake. It was born as the first being to eat more than it needed; it had been contained within Larfleeze's power battery and it spoke to Hal Jordan when he briefly gained control of the battery. Ophidian, along with the other emotional entities, are currently being hunted by Krona. The White Entity intones for Hal, Carol, and Sinestro to find the entities before it is too late. According to Atrocitus' divining ritual, Ophidian can be found in the upper midwestern United States. It is sought by Hector Hammond, who in turn is receiving orders from Krona himself. When Larfleeze refuses to release the entity from the power battery, Hammond simply swallows the whole battery and is transformed into the host for Ophidian.

It is implied that Ophidian doesn't like Larfleeze very much (possibly because he kept it trapped in his battery), and Larfleeze seems quite concerned about Ophidian's freedom. Ophidian also implies that it is going to "get even" with Larfleeze.

Ophidian would later join Krona, and with its disruptive powers, help the renegade Guardian of the Universe discover the location of the Butcher. Ophidian was last seen returning with Krona to Ryut where he will begin purging the universe of all emotionally unbalanced beings. Afterwards Ophidian is seen without its host, launching along with the other entities and Krona an attack on Oa, where it possessed a Guardian of the Universe. Ophidian was eventually free from Krona's control, after Hal Jordan defeated and killed the rogue Guardian. Ophidian roams at large in the Universe once again but it soon began suffering from a strange illness, later revealed to be the reservoir of the emotional spectrum was becoming exhausted. After Relic wiped out the Blue Lantern Corps and forcefully drained the green light from Oa's Central Power Battery and destroying the planet in the process, and while Ophidian represents the emotion of greed, the entity willingly sacrifices itself by passing into the Source Wall in order for the reservoir to be refilled.

The Book of Greed
Mainly referred to as "The Book", it is a large tome created by the user of the orange light, in this case Larfleeze, sometime after the War of The Green Lanterns, just because Larfleeze's Avarice led him to desire a tome similar to the Book of Oa that was owned by the Guardians of the Universe. The tome should contain the exploits of the Orange Lanterns and Larfleeze even kidnapped a green-skinned alien by the name of Stargrave to be his chronicler; however, because he is completely consumed by greed, the book is almost blank. This is because knowledge is something Larfleeze jealously guarded as a possession. Larfleeze’s possessiveness is the reason why he did not reveal many secrets within the book, despite the directions to the scribe.

Orange Lantern Oath 
“What’s mine is mine

And mine and mine

And mine and mine and mine

Not yours”
 -Larfleeze, Green Lantern (Volume 5) #20

Other versions 
In the universe prior to the current one, groups managed to tap into the wellspring of power created by the Emotional Spectrum. In this universe those who tapped into the orange light were known as the Lightsmiths of the Orange Light of Gluttony.

In other media
 Larfleeze appears in a self-titled episode of the Green Lantern: The Animated Series voiced by Dee Bradley Baker. This version refers to the Orange power battery as his "shiny".
 The Orange Lantern Corps appear in DC Universe Online.

References